Isluga is a stratovolcano located in Colchane,  west of the Chile-Bolivia border and at the west end of a group of volcanoes lined up in an east-west direction, which also includes the volcanoes Cabaray and Tata Sabaya. Isluga has an elongated summit area and lies within the borders of Volcán Isluga National Park in Chile's Tarapacá Region.

Geography 
Isluga lies in the commune of Colchane, Iquique Province of the Tarapaca Region, Chile. The volcano is part of the Volcán Isluga National Park, which was created in 1985. The volcano can be accessed through the International Route 55.

Isluga is part of the Andean Volcanic Belt, the volcanic zone on the western side of South America where the Nazca plate is subducted beneath the South American plate. Isluga is part of the segment named the Central Volcanic Zone. In the Tarapaca region other volcanoes have been active in the Holocene, such as Guallatiri, Parinacota and Taapaca.

There are several volcanic units in the Isluga area. A pre-Isluga unit containing Cabay volcano, northeastern Carcanchuni and southern Cerro Blanco are not stratigraphically controlled. The Enquelga unit is the first Isluga unit proper. Further, Isluga and Tata Sabaya and some other volcanoes form a lineament which may coincide with the suture between the Chilenia terrane and the Arequipa-Antofalla block.

The volcano itself is constructed from lava domes and flows on top of Miocene ignimbrites. Several stages of eruptive activity are recognized, some of them exposed through erosion. A northwestern debris avalanche has been found on Isluga, on top of which the recent volcano is constructed. The fumarolically active crater region has been buried with surge deposits from phreatomagmatic activity, and the northern ridge is covered by Holocene lavas. A glaciated dacitic lava flow is dated 0.096±0.006 Ma by K-Ar analysis. North of Isluga lies the dissected Quimsachatas volcano, which has been dated at 0.566±0.017 Ma. Both the summit crater and the area below the crater on the southern flank are faintly fumarolically active, with yellow sulfur deposits observed. The fumaroles appear to produce water vapour.

Eruptive activity 

Isluga erupted in February 1878 following the 1878 Tarapaca earthquake. Voluminous lava emissions destroyed the towns of Carima, Cariquima, Chiapa, Libiza and Sotoca, and the eruption was accompanied with strong earthquake activity in Cariquima. Other eruptions have been reported in August 1863, a major eruption in 1868 and August 1869, 1877 and 1878 and minor eruptions in 1863 and 1885.

Isluga last erupted in 1913, but ongoing volcanic earthquake activity has been observed. The volcano hosts some of the Andes' largest thermal anomalies in satellite images and increased fumarolic activity in 2002–2003 was reported. Some earthquake activity may be associated with neighbouring hydrothermal fields. A phreatic eruption was observed in 2005; whether it was related to the 2005 Tarapacá earthquake half a year earlier is unclear.

Petrology 
Isluga's lavas are andesitic to trachyandesitic in composition with SiO2 contents between 56-61%. The andesites are porphyritic with more than half phenocrysts and high potassium content (2.7-3.6%), moderate aluminium and high magnesium, although some hornblendes have high Na/K ratios. The petrology of the Isluga lineament lavas indicates an origin either in 3-5% partial melting of the mantle, or by a 15% partial melting of a granite-containing mantle with subsequent fractionation of mafic components.

Climate 

Mythology and archeology 
Also named Laram Qhawani, the volcano dominating the village of Enquelca is a sacred mountain, responsible for health, wealth and rain. It is considered a female spirit married to Cabarray. While no archeological remains have been found on its summit, a triangular stone structure resembles the patterns drawn when making offerings to spirits. One of the ends of the triangular structure points to Cerro Cariquima, another sacred mountain. Another archeological place was found at ca. 5,200 m (17,056') on the southern ridge, probably serving as protection against wind and with a niche in the walls that probably served ritual purposes.

Threats 
Threats from future eruptions of Isluga consist primarily in the contamination of aquifers and destruction of agricultural areas by ash falls, both limiting factors in the desertic environment surrounding the volcano. Additionally, the cultural value of the region would be endangered, also given the relative lack of documentation thereof.

See also 

 List of volcanoes in Chile

References

External links 

Active volcanoes
Volcanoes of Tarapacá Region
Stratovolcanoes of Chile
Mountains of Chile
Five-thousanders of the Andes
Holocene stratovolcanoes